is a Japanese footballer currently playing as a midfielder. He currently play for YSCC Yokohama of J3 League.

Career

Taba announcement officially first signing contract with YSCC Yokohama for 2019 season.

Personal life

Taba is Japanese-Peruvian due to grandfather.

Career statistics

Club
.

Notes

References

External links

1996 births
Living people
Sportspeople from Kanagawa Prefecture
Association football people from Kanagawa Prefecture
Kokushikan University alumni
Japanese footballers
Japanese people of Peruvian descent
Association football midfielders
J3 League players
YSCC Yokohama players